Ivan Leonidovich Tkachenko (9 November 1979 – 7 September 2011) was a Russian professional ice hockey winger who played for Lokomotiv Yaroslavl of the Kontinental Hockey League (KHL). He was selected by the Columbus Blue Jackets in the 4th round (98th overall) of the 2002 NHL Entry Draft.

Death
On 7 September 2011, Tkachenko was killed in the 2011 Lokomotiv Yaroslavl plane crash, when a Yakovlev Yak-42 passenger aircraft carrying nearly his entire Lokomotiv team crashed just outside Yaroslavl, Russia. The team was traveling to Minsk to play their opening game of the season, with its coaching staff and prospects. Lokomotiv officials said, "Everyone from the main roster was on the plane plus four players from the youth team."

Charity
Three weeks after Tkachenko's death, information appeared in the Internet that during the last four years of his life he had anonymously donated almost ten million rubles (over 300,000 US dollars) for the treatment of children suffering from serious diseases. He transferred 500 000 rubles on the day before his death.

Career statistics

Regular season and playoffs

International

See also
List of ice hockey players who died during their playing career

References

External links

1979 births
2011 deaths
Lokomotiv Yaroslavl players
Sportspeople from Yaroslavl
Russian ice hockey forwards
Victims of the Lokomotiv Yaroslavl plane crash
Columbus Blue Jackets draft picks